Battalion was launched at Whitby in 1795. She traded with the Baltic and then in 1796 became a Liverpool-based West Indiaman. A French privateer captured her in 1797 in a single ship action as Battalion was outbound on her first voyage to Jamaica. The Royal Navy quickly recaptured her. She was last listed in Lloyd's Register (LR) in 1797.

Battalion first appeared in Lloyd's Register in 1795. 

Battalion was sold to Liverpool in 1796. Her new owners sailed her as a West Indiaman. 

Captain Thomas Oxton acquired a letter of marque on 4 January 1797. Jeune Emilie was armed with 10 guns and eight swivel guns, and had a crew of 80 men.

On 11 February  took the 10-gun privateer brig Jeune Emilie, which was forty days out of Saint-Malo and had taken the sloop Friendship as well as the 10-gun letter of marque Battalion.

Battalion was sold for Livres 93,249, about £stg3800.

Notes

Citations

References
  
 
 
 
 

1795 ships
Ships built in Whitby
Age of Sail merchant ships of England
Captured ships